Yintai District is a district under the administration of Tongchuan city in Shaanxi province of the People's Republic of China. Its area is 627 square kilometers, with a population of approximately 230,000 people as of 2002.

Administrative divisions
Yintai District administers two neighbourhoods, seven towns, and three rural townships. The neighbourhoods are Chengguan and Sanlidong. The towns are Yuhua, Jinsuoguan, Wangshiwa, Hongtu, Azhuang, Guangyang, and Chenlu. The rural townships are Yintai, Xiaojiabao, and Gaolouhe.

External links
Yintai District Government Website (Chinese)

Districts of Shaanxi
Tongchuan